The Îles Laval are an island grouping in the Rivière des Prairies in southwestern Quebec, part of the Hochelaga Archipelago.

Formerly an independent municipality (Les Îles-Laval), they became part of the city of Laval on August 6, 1965.

Geography 
Located northeast of Île Bizard between the Island of Montreal and Île Jésus (Laval Island), they include Île Bigras, Île Pariseau, Île Verte and Île Ronde.

Transportation  
They are served by the Île Bigras station of the Deux-Montagnes commuter train line which crosses the islands. A road bridge links the islands with the Sainte-Dorothée district of Laval, on Île Jésus.

There is a shared taxi, T26, on the island.

See also 
 Hochelaga Archipelago
 List of crossings of the Rivière des Prairies
 List of islands of Quebec

References

External links

Laval
Landforms of Laval, Quebec
Former municipalities in Quebec
Neighbourhoods in Laval, Quebec
Rivière des Prairies
Populated places disestablished in 1965